Josif Zakharovich Shtokalo (November 16, 1897 – January 5, 1987) was a famous Ukrainian mathematician. Shtokalo worked mainly in the areas of differential equations, operational calculus and the history of mathematics.

Investigation of the Stability of Lindstedt's Equation Using Shtokalo’s Method by Samuel Kohn contains a description of Shotkalo's method in English.

References 

1897 births
1987 deaths
Soviet mathematicians
20th-century Ukrainian mathematicians